ESER is an abbreviation for Einheitliches System Elektronischer Rechenmaschinen (German for  standardized system of electronic computers), a term used in the GDR for ES EVM computers produced according to a treaty between the members of Comecon signed on December 23, 1968 covering the development of a standardized computing system.

ESER was also the name for computers developed by this standard. Most ESER Computers were named ЕС (which is Cyrillic for "ES") followed by a four digit number, e.g., EC 1055, often also called ESER (e.g., ESER 1055). Robotron also produced minicomputers, whose names started with "K" (Kleinrechner for "minicomputer").

The ESER systems were in operation in GDR and later in the new states of Germany until 1995.

GDR manufacturing
 Robotron
 EC 1834, 1835 (IBM PC XT compatibles)
 EC 1040, 1055, 1055M, 1056, 1057
 EC 7927
 K 1001, 1002, 1003, K 1510, K 1520, K 1820, K 5103, K 5201, K 8913, K 8915, K 8924
 CM 1910

Hungarian manufacturing
Videoton
 EC 1010, 1011, 1012

See also
History of computer hardware in Eastern Bloc countries

External links
Technical data of some ESER computers by Robotron
Technical data of some ESER computers by Videoton
Some photos of a ESER Mainframe
Overview of different ESER Mainframes in German (page 6, PDF)
Overview of different ESER Computers in Russian (with pictures)

Computer standards
Eastern Bloc
Comecon